Ticket to Ride is a railway-themed German-style board game designed by Alan R. Moon. It was illustrated by Julien Delval and Cyrille Daujean and published in 2004 by Days of Wonder. The game is also known as Zug um Zug (German), Les Aventuriers du Rail (French), Aventureros al Tren (Spanish), Wsiąść do pociągu (Polish), and Menolippu (Finnish).

The game's original version is played on a board depicting a railway map of the United States and southern Canada. Localized editions have subsequently been published depicting maps of other countries, cities, and regions. Players collect and play train car cards to claim train routes across the map. Points are earned based on the length of the claimed routes, whoever completes the longest continuous railway, and whether the player can connect distant cities which are determined by drawing ticket cards.

The game won the 2004 Spiel des Jahres, the Origins Award for Best Board Game of 2004, the 2005 Diana Jones award, the 2005 As d'Or Jeu de l'année, and placed second in the Schweizer Spielepreis for Family Games. Ticket to Ride: Europe won the 2005 International Gamers Award.  As of August 2008, over 750,000 copies of the game had been sold according to the publisher. As of October 2014, over three million copies were reported sold, with retail sales of over $150 million.

Gameplay

At the beginning of the main game, players are dealt four train car cards as their playing hand. They are also dealt three Destination Ticket cards, each showing a pair of cities on a map of the United States and southern Canada. These become goals, representing two end-points that players secretly attempt to connect. The player must keep at least two of these destination cards and discard unwanted tickets, if any, to the bottom of the stack. Once kept, a destination ticket may not be discarded for the rest of the game. Each player selects a group of 45 colored train pieces with a matching scoring marker.

Each turn, the player has to choose from one of three options:
 draw two railway car cards in various colours from the draw piles (with the restriction that drawing a wild Locomotive card face up forfeits drawing another card), or
 draw three additional destination ticket cards and keep at least one (replacing undesired tickets at the bottom of the stack), or
 play their collected railway car cards from their hand to claim a route on the board and place the corresponding number of train pieces from their store on the claimed route, thereby earning points.

The routes are of varying lengths (requiring varying numbers of matching coloured cards), and only a single player can claim each discrete route marked on the board. Some cities are connected by two parallel routes that can each be claimed by a different player (unless the game is played by three or fewer players, in which case only one of the routes can be claimed). The same player may not claim both parallel routes between two adjacent cities. Longer routes are worth progressively more points than shorter routes, e.g., a route of length four is worth more than two routes of length two.

On their turn, a player can claim any route on the board that has not already been claimed, regardless of whether the route helps to complete their destination tickets. The routes score points by themselves, as mentioned above, but routes not connected to a player's destination do not help them reach the destination or complete their destination ticket.

The game ends when one player has only two or fewer of their supply of coloured train pieces. When this occurs, every player then plays one additional turn, after which they each reveal their previously hidden destination tickets. Additional points are awarded for having successfully connected the destinations on the cards, whereas points are subtracted for any incomplete tickets. A ten-point bonus is awarded to the player who has the longest continuously connected set of routes.

Since the game's release in 2004, Days of Wonder has released additional stand-alone board games, expansion maps - which require a base game to play, a card game, and multiple electronic game versions.

Board games
The original game features "railway routes connecting cities throughout North America", and was released in 2004. In 2008, Days of Wonder released USA 1910, a card expansion that contains additional destination tickets and a full-size deck for both routes and railway cards to replace the much smaller ones included in the original game.

Ticket to Ride: 10th Anniversary;
In 2014, the company released Ticket to Ride: 10th Anniversary, which has a larger map of the original game (USA) and metal boxes for the trains. There are no rule changes to the game, but the map and cars are larger and have been redesigned. The USA 1910 expansion is also included in this version.

Ticket to Ride: 15th Anniversary
A 15th Anniversary edition was released in August 2019 with translucent train cars and a special booklet detailing the history of the game. The card borders and backs were updated and are clearer and more vibrant than in earlier editions. There are no rule changes to the game and no expansions are included in this edition.

Europe

A Europe version was released in 2005. Ticket to Ride: Europe takes place on a map of Europe as it was at the turn of the 20th century. Two new types of routes were introduced: Ferry routes that require locomotive cards to be played when claiming them, and tunnel routes which add the risk that additional train cards may be necessary to complete the route. The game includes "stations" which allow the player to use a route owned by another player and thus complete their destination ticket. In 2009, DOW released Europe 1912, a card expansion for the European game. It contains additional destination tickets, and an additional play mechanic— Warehouses. In 2015, DOW released a mini extension Orient Express, containing eight destination tickets featuring a route of Orient Express.

Europe: 15th Anniversary

Similar to the original's 10th-anniversary edition, a larger map of Europe was released in 2021. This edition includes detailed train sets in metal tin boxes and train cards designed for the event. The green train set was removed and replaced by pink ones. It also features the destination cards from the original game, Europe 1912, Orient Express, and a promo card, bringing the count to 108.

Märklin
A German version, Ticket to Ride: Märklin, was released in 2006 by Märklin, a German toy company best known for model railways and technical toys. Whereas railway car cards of each type in the previous games were identical, the cards in Ticket to Ride: Märklin each show a different image of Märklin rolling stock. This edition features a passenger mechanic, where a passenger token is placed on the board, and can claim point tokens by traveling along a player's route.

Nordic countries
Released in late October 2007, Ticket to Ride: Nordic Countries is based on a map of the Nordic countries as the name suggests, also including parts of Russia and Estonia. This version also incorporates the ferry routes and tunnels from Ticket to Ride: Europe. Players only receive a set of 40 colored train pieces for this version, and it is playable by 2 or 3 players only. Following its success in the eponymous countries, this version also became available in the English, French, and German languages.

Germany
In September 2012, Zug um Zug: Deutschland  ("Ticket to Ride: Germany") was released by Asmodee GmbH, Days of Wonder's German distributor. It was developed and produced specifically at Asmodee GmbH's request (as Ticket to Ride: Märklin had gone out of print) and was only available in Germany and Austria. It is an adaptation of the same map and routes in Märklin, set in turn-of-the-20th-century Germany. In 2015, Asmodee GmbH released Deutschland 1902, a card expansion for the German map that contains additional destination tickets. In 2017, Ticket to Ride: Germany was released in the US. It is a combination of Zug um Zug: Deutschland together with Deutschland 1902.

Rails & Sails

Released in September 2016, Ticket to Ride: Rails & Sails is a standalone game with a double-sided board, the largest used in any Ticket to Ride game. One side is "The World" map and the other is "The Great Lakes" map. This version contains train pieces and ship pieces to be played on land routes and water routes respectively. The travel cards include a modified train card deck and a new "ship deck" used to claim land or water routes respectively. Also included are 3 harbor tokens for each player.

Northern Lights. 

Released 2022-11-09.
Northern lights is a stand alone game. 

First Journey
Released as an exclusive item in Target stores in 2016, First Journey is designed for children 6 and up. This version is for 2 to 4 players. The board is smaller than the base version, connections are shorter, and game time is quicker. There are no points in this game, but players race to complete six destination tickets. In 2017, Days of Wonder would also create a version for Europe, with the same rules but a European map.

Ticket to Ride: Cities Collection
Maps in the Cities Collection features the same gameplay from the Ticket to Ride game series – collect cards, claim routes, draw tickets – on a scaled-down map that allows for a shorter game time.
 New York (2018). Instead of trains, the tokens are taxis.
 London (2019). Instead of trains, the tokens are buses.
 Amsterdam (2020). Instead of trains, the tokens are horse-drawn carts.
 San Francisco (2022). Instead of trains, the pieces are cable cars. Also, it features new Tourist tokens in the city's famous landmarks.

Ticket to Ride: Map Collections
Starting in 2011, Days of Wonder began releasing expansions consisting of new maps. Each game introduces new rules specific to that version, and requires pieces from either Ticket to Ride: USA, Europe, Germany, or Nordic Countries to play. The following map collections have been released to date:
 Volume 1: Asia - Team Asia and Legendary Asia (2011). Team Asia allows 6 player games, on teams of two, while Legendary Asia introduces Mountain Routes.
 Volume 2: India + Switzerland (2011). India has a bonus for connecting your destinations in a mandala (circle); it is for 2-4 players. Switzerland introduced the city-to-country and country-to-country cards; it is for 2 or 3 players only. 
 Volume 3: The Heart of Africa (2012). The Heart of Africa introduces Terrain cards, which give a bonus when claiming a route if you also have the terrain cards to match it.
 Volume 4: Nederland (2013). This is the first ticket-to-ride game with a currency system, used to pay bridge tolls for your routes.
 Volume 5: United Kingdom + Pennsylvania (2015). United Kingdom introduces a technology system, requiring upgrades to complete certain routes. Pennsylvania has a stock market system.
 Volume 6: France + Old West (2017). The France board is mostly blank, requiring you to lay tracks to decide the color of the route before you can claim that route. Old West allows for 6 individual players. It introduces the city system and breaks from Ticket to Ride tradition by only allowing you to build routes that connect to your initial city.
 Volume 6 1/2: Poland (2019; 2022). This collection was published by Rebel under the Polish name Wsiąść do Pociągu - Polska. It was planned as a Polish exclusive, but by early December was available from online merchants in the rest of Europe, but for a limited sale only; the trade was shut down in January. However, DOW officially announced that the volume will be launched worldwide in September 2022. It is the smallest expansion map board in the series, having only 4 sections as opposed to the standard 6. Gameplay has an emphasis on connections to neighboring countries.
 Volume 7: Japan + Italy (2019). Japan features bullet trains, which are collaboratively built and accessible to anyone. Italy features a new ferry mechanic and republishes its Globetrotter by adding Provinces. 
 Stay at Home (2020). Released to mark the COVID-19 pandemic. It's a free print at home expansion that allows players to control family members as they navigate domestic life and complete daily tasks.

Card game

Ticket to Ride: The Card Game
The card game was released in the summer of 2008 and includes a similar artistic style and theme, and general game mechanism to the set collection. The card game is playable in 30–45 minutes and supports 2-4 players. Players start with 1 locomotive card and 7 other random train cards in their hands. Players are also dealt 6 destination tickets of which they must keep at least 1. The destination tickets have 1 to 5 colored dots which match the colors of the train cards. In order to complete a destination ticket, players must move cards from their hand to their rail yard (playing area directly in front of the player), and finally to their on-the-track stack (scoring area). During play, players can "train rob" another player, by playing more of a specific color than their opponent has in their rail yard. When the train card draws piles are exhausted, the players use the train cards in their on-the-track stack to complete their destination tickets, by matching the colored train cards with the colored dots on the destination tickets. Completed tickets are added to the player's score, while uncompleted tickets are subtracted. Additional bonus points are awarded to players who complete the most tickets to the six big cities, Chicago, Dallas, Los Angeles, Miami, New York, and Seattle.

Computer games

Ticket to Ride: Online
Ticket to Ride and most expansions can be played online at Days of Wonder's website. A four-game free trial subscription is available. Due to the major browsers and Adobe discontinuing support for Flash, the future of this version of the game is uncertain.

Ticket to Ride: The Computer Game
Days of Wonder also released a computer game for Windows, OS X, and Linux that allows players to play the original game. Ticket to Ride: Europe, Ticket to Ride: Switzerland and Ticket to Ride: USA 1910 expansions are available as purchasable enhancements to the game. In February 2017 Days of wonder abandoned Linux support. However the current version available on Steam is playable under Linux.

The game has received generally favorable reviews.

Ticket to Ride: Xbox Live Arcade
The Xbox Live Arcade version was released on 25 June 2008, and supports play with up to five people on Xbox Live or four people on the same console, and can use the Xbox Live Vision cam.

Ticket to Ride: iPad
The iPad version was released on 18 May 2011 and supports play with up to five people using the Game Center or Days of Wonder's own servers. Its offline mode originally only supported a single player with up to four computer players; however, pass and play was added later.

This version was released with three additional extensions available for purchase and download: Ticket to Ride: Europe; Ticket to Ride: Switzerland; and Ticket to Ride: USA 1910, which itself includes three separate game modes. In August 2012, Ticket to Ride: Legendary Asia was added, and in April 2016, Ticket to Ride: Nordic Countries became available.

The iPad version of Ticket to Ride was named the 2011 Digital Game of the Year by the Danish Guldbrikken (The Golden Pawn) Awards, which referred to the game as "the exemplar of how a board game makes the leap to the digital world without compromise. The iPad version dazzles with its superb finish, easy availability and unparalleled expandability, as well as the ability to play on just the iPad or over the Internet."

Ticket to Ride Pocket (iPhone and iPod Touch)
The iPhone version was released on 16 November 2011, which is a simplified version of the iPad game. Online play was added as an update on 2 February 2012, and users can also play a multi-player game on a local network via WiFi or Bluetooth. The company released a redesigned version of the digital game in November 2015.

Ticket to Ride with Alexa Digital Assistant
Amazon's Alexa Digital Assistant can now play Ticket to Ride and Ticket to Ride: Europe, provided the players have a physical copy of the game.

Reception
The game won numerous awards after being released, including the 2004 Spiel des Jahres (game of the year).

Mike Fitzgerald calls Ticket to Ride "a game that I never tire of, one that lends itself well to the many expansions that Days of Wonder have released. The design principles it uses are all simple and have been done before, but they have never been put together in a game as compelling as Ticket to Ride." Board Game Quest mentioned that it is "one of the greatest gateway games ever made", and Board Games Land described it as "one of the best family board games ever made". Many of its expansions have also been positively received by critics.

Reviews
Pyramid

Awards and honours

See also
Railway Rivals (a similar train board game)

References

External links

 Days of Wonder's Ticket to Ride site
 

Embracer Group franchises
Railroad board games
Connection games
Spiel des Jahres winners
Origins Award winners
Alan R. Moon games
Days of Wonder games
Board games introduced in 2004